Lasius californicus is a species of ant belonging to the genus Lasius, and was formerly a part of the genus Acanthomyops (now a subgenus). Described in 1917 by Wheeler, the species is native to the United States.

References

External links

californicus
Hymenoptera of North America
Insects of the United States
Insects described in 1917